Musabyimana Jean Claude is a Rwandan politician currently working as minister of the national administration.

Notable Work

Jean Claude Musabyimana became permanent secretary in the Ministry of Agriculture and Animal Resources.

He was Permanent Secretary in the Ministry of Lands and Forests (MINILAF)

He has more than 15 years of experience as a teacher and as a local representative.

From 2016 to 207 he served as the governor of the Northern Province.

He became the mayor of Musanze district.

He was the deputy mayor of Musanze District in charge of development and economy.

References

Living people
Rwandan politicians
Government ministers of Rwanda
21st-century Rwandan politicians
Year of birth missing (living people)